Andreas Petermann (born 7 June 1957) is a retired German cyclist. He won a gold medal in the 100 km team time trial at the 1979 UCI Road World Championships. Next year he competed for East Germany at the 1980 Summer Olympics in the individual road race and finished in tenth place.

In 1979, he finished in second place in the Peace Race. He won the Thüringen Rundfahrt der U23 in 1980 and 1981 and the Tour du Maroc in 1983.

After retirement from competitions, he worked as a college lecturer in cycling in Leipzig. Between 1986 and 1994 he was involved in research on training of track cyclists. From 1995 to 2000 he was a head coach of the German Triathlon Union in the areas of performance diagnostics and training analysis. He was also responsible for the junior squad. From 2000 he worked with various professional cycling teams such as Coast, Bianchi and Wiesenhof. Between 2008 and 2011 he was the head coach in track cycling for the German Cycling Federation.

References

1957 births
Living people
Olympic cyclists of East Germany
Cyclists at the 1980 Summer Olympics
East German male cyclists
German male cyclists
People from Greiz
Cyclists from Thuringia
UCI Road World Champions (elite men)
People from Bezirk Gera